Andrew Matarazzo (born March 4, 1991) is a Brazilian-American actor, best known for joining the cast of the MTV television series Teen Wolf in its final season.

Early life
Matarazzo was born in São Paulo, Brazil but raised mostly in Miami, Florida as part of a diverse, multilingual family where he grew up speaking Portuguese, English and Spanish. His mother Jade Matarazzo is a leader at the forefront of the Latino arts community both for her own work and helping expose other international artists to American audiences. Although he had performed on stage since childhood, Matarazzo only decided to branch into film after seeing River Phoenix in Stand by Me.

He studied in Thorpe, Surrey near London at the American School in England (TASIS) as well as spending some time at University of the Arts (Philadelphia) and the California Institute of the Arts (CalArts) in Los Angeles.

Career
In Los Angeles, Matarazzo, landed roles in a series of festival circuit short films that ran at Tribeca Film Festival and Cannes Film Festival. He went on to play small roles in several television shows including HBO's Girls, MTV's Faking It, Criminal Minds on CBS, and Speechless on ABC.

Matarazzo auditioned for Teen Wolf in 2016 but did not get the part for which he read. Two weeks later, Teen Wolf executive producer Jeff 
Davis contacted the actor to say they wanted Matarazzo for a three-episode arc. After seeing his work, Davis and the show's writers extended the role through the series finale and made Matarazzo's character Gabe one of the season's primary villains.

Filmography

Film

Television

References

External links 

 
 

1997 births
Living people
Male actors from São Paulo
Brazilian people of Italian descent
Brazilian emigrants to the United States
American people of Italian descent
American male film actors
American male television actors
Male actors from Miami
21st-century American male actors